Bruce Ronald Henderson, also known as Bruce Grenville and Martin Renwick (born 1950), is a New Zealand anarchist, hoaxer and producer of artistamps. He is particularly known for the creation of the fictional Sultanate of Occussi-Ambeno.

Early life
Bruce Henderson was born in Wellington, New Zealand, in 1950.

Sultanate of Occussi-Ambeno
In the 1970s and 1980s he gained notoriety for a hoax involving the fabrication of the utopian Sultanate State of Occussi-Ambeno, located as an exclave on the Island of Timor, with himself as the self-proclaimed Sultan. Stamps were produced for the "Sultanate".

Doctor Who
In January 1999, he came to notice for the discovery of a long missing 1965 original episode of the BBC television series Doctor Who, discovered in a garage sale in Napier.

Selected publications
"Voyages to Imaginary Countries" in Artistamps Francobolli D'Artista, James Warren Felter (Ed.), AAA Edizioni, Bertiolo, Italy, 2000.

References

Further reading
 Bruce Grenville and the Utopian State of Occussi-Ambeno
 Boraman, T. (2007) Rabble Rousers and Merry Pranksters: A History of Anarchism in Aotearoa/New Zealand from the Mid-1950s to the Early 1980s. Christchurch: Katipo Books and Irrecuperable Press.

1950 births
Living people
New Zealand philatelists
New Zealand anarchists